A generic trademark, also known as a genericized trademark or proprietary eponym, is a trademark or brand name that, because of its popularity or significance, has become the generic term for, or synonymous with, a general class of products or services, usually against the intentions of the trademark's owner.

A trademark is said to become genericized—or, informally, to have "suffered" genericide—when it begins as a distinctive product identifier but changes in meaning to become generic.  This typically happens when the products or services which the trademark is associated with have acquired substantial market dominance or mind share, such that the primary meaning of the genericized trademark becomes the product or service itself rather than an indication of source for the product or service. A trademark thus popularized has its legal protection at risk in some countries such as the United States and United Kingdom, as its intellectual property rights in the trademark may be lost and competitors enabled to use the genericized trademark to describe their similar products, unless the owner of an affected trademark works sufficiently to correct and prevent such broad use.

In subpopulations 
Genericization or "loss of secondary meaning" may be prevalent among either the general population or just a subpopulation, such as among people who work in a particular industry. Some examples of the latter type from the vocabulary of physicians include the names Luer-Lok (Luer lock), Phoroptor (phoropter), and Port-a-Cath (portacath), which have genericized mind share (among physicians) because no alternative generic name for the idea is widely used, and as a result, users may not realize that the term is a brand name rather than a medical eponym or generic-etymology term.

Most often, genericization occurs because of heavy advertising that fails to provide an alternative generic name or that uses the trademark in similar fashion to generic terms.  Thus, when the Otis Elevator Company advertised that it offered "the latest in elevator and escalator design", it was using the well-known generic term "elevator" and Otis' trademark "Escalator" for moving staircases in the same way.  The United States Patent and Trademark Office and domestic courts concluded that, if Otis used their trademark in that generic way, they could not stop Westinghouse from calling its moving staircases "escalators", and a valuable trademark was lost through genericization.

In pharmaceuticals 

The pharmaceutical industry affords some protection from genericization of trade names with the modern practice of assigning a nonproprietary name for a drug based upon chemical structure. Brand-name drugs have well-known nonproprietary names from the beginning of their commercial existence, even while still under patent, preventing the aforementioned problem of "no alternative generic name for the idea readily coming to mind". For example, even when Abilify was new, its nonproprietary name, aripiprazole, was well documented.  Another example is warfarin, which was known as an ingredient in rat poison before it was approved for human use under the brand name of Coumadin.

Examples of genericization before the modern system of generic drugs include aspirin, introduced to the market in 1897, and heroin, introduced in 1898. Both were originally trademarks of Bayer AG. However, U.S. court rulings in 1918 and 1921 found the terms to be genericized, stating the company's failure to reinforce the brand's connection with their product as the reason.

A different sense of the word genericized in the pharmaceutical industry refers to products whose patent protection has expired. For example, Lipitor was genericized in the U.S. when the first competing generic version was approved by the FDA in November 2011. In this same context, the term genericization refers to the process of a brand drug losing market exclusivity to generics.

Trademark erosion 

Trademark erosion, or genericization, is a special case of antonomasia related to trademarks. It happens when a trademark becomes so common that it starts being used as a common name and the original company has failed to prevent such use. Once it has become an appellative, the word cannot be registered any more; this is why companies try hard not to let their trademark become too common, a phenomenon that could otherwise be considered a successful move since it would mean that the company gained an exceptional recognition. An example of trademark erosion is the verb “to hoover” (used with the meaning of “vacuum cleaning”), originated from the Hoover company brand name.

Nintendo is an example of a brand that successfully fought trademark erosion, having managed to replace excessive use of its name by the then-neologism game console.

Legal concepts 
Whether or not a mark is popularly identified as genericized, the owner of the mark may still be able to enforce the proprietary rights that attach to the use or registration of the mark, as long as the mark continues to exclusively identify the owner as the commercial origin of the applicable products or services. If the mark does not perform this essential function and it is no longer possible to legally enforce rights in relation to the mark, the mark may have become generic. In many legal systems (e.g., in the United States but not in Germany) a generic mark forms part of the public domain and can be commercially exploited by anyone. Nevertheless, there exists the possibility of a trademark becoming a revocable generic term in German (and European) trademark law.

The process by which trademark rights are diminished or lost as a result of common use in the marketplace is known as genericization. This process typically occurs over a period of time in which a mark is not used as a trademark (i.e., where it is not used to exclusively identify the products or services of a particular business), where a mark falls into disuse entirely, or where the trademark owner does not enforce its rights through actions for passing off or trademark infringement.

One risk factor that may lead to genericization is the use of a trademark as a verb, plural or possessive, unless the mark itself is possessive or plural (e.g., "Friendly's" restaurants).

However, in highly inflected languages, a tradename may have to carry case endings in usage. An example is Finnish, where "Microsoftin" is the genitive case and "Facebookista" is the elative case.

Avoiding genericization 
Generic use of a trademark presents an inherent risk to the effective enforcement of trademark rights and may ultimately lead to genericization.

Trademark owners may take various steps to reduce the risk, including educating businesses and consumers on appropriate trademark use, avoiding use of their marks in a generic manner, and systematically and effectively enforcing their trademark rights. If a trademark is associated with a new invention, the trademark owner may also consider developing a generic term for the product to be used in descriptive contexts, to avoid inappropriate use of the "house" mark. Such a term is called a generic descriptor, and is frequently used immediately after the trademark to provide a description of the product or service. For example, "Kleenex tissues" ("facial tissues" being the generic descriptor) or "Velcro-brand fasteners" for Velcro brand name hook-and-loop fasteners.

Another common practice among trademark owners is to follow their trademark with the word brand to help define the word as a trademark. Johnson & Johnson changed the lyrics of their Band-Aid television commercial jingle from, "I am stuck on Band-Aids, 'cause Band-Aid's stuck on me" to "I am stuck on Band-Aid brand, 'cause Band-Aid's stuck on me." Google has gone to lengths to prevent this process, discouraging publications from using the term 'googling' in reference to Web searches. In 2006, both the Oxford English Dictionary and the Merriam Webster Collegiate Dictionary struck a balance between acknowledging widespread use of the verb coinage and preserving the particular search engine's association with the coinage, defining google (all lower case, with -le ending) as a verb meaning "use the Google search engine to obtain information on the Internet".

Where a trademark is used generically, a trademark owner may need to take aggressive measures to retain exclusive rights to the trademark. Xerox Corporation attempted to prevent the genericization of its core trademark through an extensive public relations campaign advising consumers to "photocopy" instead of "xerox" documents.

One example of an active effort to prevent the genericization of a trademark was that of the Lego Company, which printed in manuals in the 1970s and 1980s a request to customers that they call the company's interlocking plastic building blocks Lego bricks', 'blocks' or 'toys', and not 'Legos'." While this went largely unheeded, and many children and adults in the U.S. referred to and continue to refer to the pieces as "Legos", use of the deprecated term remained largely confined to the Lego Company's own products – and not, for example, to Tyco's competing and interchangeable product – so genericization of the Lego trademark did not occur.

Adobe Systems is working to prevent the genericization of their trademarks, such as Photoshop, but has had mixed success. This is shown via recurring use of the adjective "photoshopped", or the shortened version "shopped", throughout the Internet and mass media.

Protected designation of origin 
Since 2003, the European Union has actively sought to restrict the use of geographical indications by third parties outside the EU by enforcing laws regarding "protected designation of origin". Although a geographical indication for specialty food or drink may be generic, it is not a trademark because it does not serve to identify exclusively a specific commercial enterprise and therefore cannot constitute a genericized trademark.

The extension of protection for geographical indications is somewhat controversial. A geographical indication may have been registered as a trademark elsewhere; for example, if "Parma Ham" was part of a trademark registered in Canada by a Canadian manufacturer, then ham manufacturers in Parma, Italy, might be unable to use this name in Canada. Wines (such as Bordeaux, Port and Champagne), cheeses (such as Roquefort, Parmesan, Gouda, and Feta), Pisco liquor, and Scotch whisky are examples of geographical indications. Compare Russian use of "Шампанское" (= Shampanskoye) for champagne-type wine made in Russia.

In the 1990s, the Parma consortium successfully sued the Asda supermarket chain to prevent it using the description "Parma ham" on prosciutto produced in Parma but sliced outside the Parma region. The European Court ruled that pre-packaged ham must be produced, sliced, and packaged in Parma in order to be labeled for sale as "Parma ham".

Scale of distinctiveness 

A trademark is said to fall somewhere along a scale from being "distinctive" to "generic" (used primarily as a common name for the product or service rather than an indication of source).  Among distinctive trademarks the scale goes from strong to weak:
 "Fanciful" or "coined"
 original words with no meaning as to the nature of the product
 "Arbitrary" 
 existing words with little if any reference to the nature of the product or service
 "Suggestive"
 having primarily trademark significance but with suggestion as to the nature of the product
 "Descriptive"
 not just suggesting, but actually describing the product or service yet still understood as indicating source
 "Merely descriptive"
 having almost entirely reference to the product or service but capable of becoming "distinctive".

See also 
 Brand management
 Eponym
 Generic brand
 List of generic and genericized trademarks
 Metonymy
 Proper adjective
 Synecdoche
 Trademark dilution

References

Further reading

External links 

 American Proprietary Eponyms, a project by R. Krause, December 1997

Brand management
Trademark law
Product management
Eponyms